During the 2011–12 season, the Guildford Flames participated in the semi-professional English Premier Ice Hockey League. It was the 20th year of ice hockey played by the Guildford Flames and the fifth season under Paul Dixon as head coach.

The offseason saw a large returning contingent quickly re-signed by the club. However, Martin Masa, Lukas Smital, and Rob Lamey all moved on to the Bracknell Bees, while Slovak netminder Miroslav Hala also left the club. New signings to join the club were Canadian forward Curtis Huppe, fellow countryman Greg Chambers, Slovak defenceman Branislav Kvetan was picked up from French side Dijon, and a young up and coming netminder, James Hadfield, joined from the Swindon Wildcats.

Player statistics

Netminders

Results

Regular season

Play-offs

References

External links
Official Guildford Flames website

Guildford Flames seasons
Guil